Ramanathapura is a village in Hassan district of Karnataka state, India.

Location
Ramanathapura is located between Konanur and Saligrama towns.

Administration
Ramanathapura is part of the Arkalgud taluk which is again part of Hassan district of Karnataka.

Post office
There is a post office at Ramanathapura and the postal code is 573133.

Educational organizations
 HMS Padavi Purva College
 BSS Junior College
 Kuvempu School
 JSP School
 GHP School

Gallery

See also
Saligrama, Mysore
Kanive
 Konanur, Hassan
 Mangalore
 Kushalanagar
 Hole Narasipur
 Keralapura

References

Cities and towns in Hassan district